Rhysopleura orbicollis is a species of beetle in the family Cicindelidae, the only species in the genus Rhysopleura.

References

Cicindelidae